Rickson is both a surname and a masculine given name. It may refer to:

Ian Rickson, British theatre and film director
Joe Rickson (1880–1958), American actor
Rickson Gracie (born 1958), Brazilian jiu-jitsu practitioner and mixed martial artist
Rickson (footballer) (born 1998), Brazilian footballer

Masculine given names